The 2019–20 Stumptown Athletic season was the club's inaugural season in the National Independent Soccer Association, a newly established third division soccer league in the United States.

Overview
On October 23, 2018, NISA announced Charlotte, North Carolina as the association's third team market. On June 28, 2019, Stumptown Athletic was unveiled as one of ten founding members of the new association and one of the eight that would take part in the inaugural 2019–20 season. The team used both CSA OrthoCarolina Sportsplex in Pineville and the Sportsplex at Matthews as home venues, with the hope of making the latter its permanent home venue sometime in the future.

On July 21, the team announced Mark Steffens as its first head coach. Stumptown announced its first two player signings, Jamaica national team midfielder Michael Binns and midfielder Jared Odenbeck, in late August. Prior to the season Hummel International was announced as Stumptown's official apparel and ball supplier.

Donald Benamna became the first Stumptown player to receive and international call-up when he was rostered for the Central African Republic's October 2019 friendly against Niger. The team won, 2–0, with Benamna making his debut in the process.

On April 27, 2020, following a stoppage of play and subsequent extension due to the COVID-19 pandemic, NISA announced the cancellation of the 2020 Spring season.

Players and staff

Roster

Technical staff 
  Mark Steffens – Head coach
  Patrick Daka – Assistant coach

Friendlies

Competitions

NISA Fall season (Showcase)

Details for the 2019 NISA Spring season were announced July 25, 2019.

Standings

Results summary

Matches

Playoff

NISA Spring season

Details for the 2020 NISA Spring season were announced January 27, 2020.

Standings

Results summary

Matches

U.S. Open Cup 

Stumptown will enter the 2020 tournament with the rest of the National Independent Soccer Association teams in the Second Round. It was announced on 29 January that their first opponent would be USL Championship side Charlotte Independence. On February 3, Charlotte announced that the game at the Sportsplex at Matthews, which both teams use as a home venue, would be free for the public to attend.

Squad statistics

Appearances and goals 

Note: This includes caps for players who were subbed in during the September 14 game against Atlanta SC, which is not reflected on the Stumptown player pages but is confirmed by the team

|-
! colspan="16" style="background:#dcdcdc; text-align:center"| Goalkeepers

|-
! colspan="16" style="background:#dcdcdc; text-align:center"| Defenders

|-
! colspan="16" style="background:#dcdcdc; text-align:center"| Midfielders

|-
! colspan="16" style="background:#dcdcdc; text-align:center"| Forwards

|-
! colspan="16" style="background:#dcdcdc; text-align:center"| Left during season

|-
|}

Goal scorers

Disciplinary record

See also
 2019–20 NISA season

References

American soccer clubs 2019 season
American soccer clubs 2020 season
2019 in sports in North Carolina
2020 in sports in North Carolina